Phoracantha punctata is a species of Cerambycinae that is native to Australia.

Description
Males are between 12 and 26mm while females are 14 to 27mm long. They are dark reddish-brown to blackish-brown, the elytra has additional pale markings.

References

 

Beetles of Australia
Phoracanthini